Cabot is an unincorporated community in Butler County, Pennsylvania, United States.

The Zip Code is 16023.

Geography 
The longitude is -79.766W.

The latitude of Cabot is 40.764N.

It is in the Eastern Standard time zone. Elevation is 1,198 feet.

History 
Cabot was founded in 1806 as a rural community in Winfield Township. The community was first founded by Frederick Doerr, but the town eventually became named after Godfrey Lowell Cabot, who founded the Cabot Academy. The community has a history of being an agricultural community closely associated with Winfield Township.

Eight-year-old Cherrie Mahan, the first child featured on the direct-mailer marketer company ADVO's "Have You Seen Me?" program, disappeared after getting off her school bus near her home near Cabot on February 22, 1985. She has never been found.

References 
History of Butler County, Pennsylvania.

Unincorporated communities in Butler County, Pennsylvania
Unincorporated communities in Pennsylvania
1806 establishments in Pennsylvania